The Kelani Valley railway line in Sri Lanka, covering the breadth of Colombo District.  The line is owned, maintained, and operated by Sri Lanka Railways.

Route definition and overview

The Kelani Valley line runs southeast from Colombo Maradana Station, through much of the city of Colombo.  It runs through major business centres, like Nugegoda and Maharagama, before turning eastwards.  It crosses the Southern Expressway near Homagama and continues east towards Avissawella, the current terminus of the line.  The line serves an increasingly urbanising community.

Major railway stations on the line are Colombo Fort, Maradana, Narahenpita, Nugegoda, Maharagama, Pannipitiya, Kottawa, Homagama, Meegoda, Padukka, Waga, Kosgama, and Avissawella.

History

Narrow-gauge era

The Kelani Valley line was originally built from Colombo to Yatiyanthota via Avissawella during 1900–1902.  It was branched off at Avissawella and extended up to Opanayaka via Ratnapura (completed in 1912).  Originally built as a  narrow-gauge line to serve the rubber plantations in the area, the railway line between Avissawella and Yatiyanthota was removed in 1942, the line from Homagama to Opanayaka abandoned in 1973.

The services were restarted up to Avissawella in 1978.

Gauge conversion
The project was finally completed up to Avissawella in 1996. The tracks beyond were completely dismantled leaving only ruined stations, bridges, and bunds.

Infrastructure
As train frequency increases, it is becoming increasingly challenging to operate trains running both direction on the single-line track.

Currently the line serves an increasingly urbanizing population leading up to Avissawella. The Kelani Valley line is not electrified.  All services run on diesel power.  Current operating speeds are limited due to the sharp curves on the line.

Locomotives and rolling stock

During the narrow-gauge era, the line had its own fleet of narrow-gauge locomotives and rolling stock. The steam locomotives of Class K and Sentinel railcars class V1 and V2 were also used.

Currently, the line is operated with broad-gauged S8   diesel multiple units.

Operation
Sri Lanka Railways has a monopoly on the operation of Kelani Valley line.

As of January, 2016, there were 20 trains operating on the line daily, mainly catering to rush hour commuters traveling to and from Colombo. In addition to this, Sri Lanka Railways introduced a rail bus service to cater commuters traveling between Kosgama and Maharagama during daytime.

See also
Sri Lanka Railways
Railway stations in Sri Lanka
Diesel locomotives of Sri Lanka

References

 Kelani Valley railway line in Google Earth
 Kelani Valley railway line in Google Maps
 infolanka.com – Mainline Diesel Hydraulic & Narrow Gauge

Railway lines opened in 1912
Railway lines closed in 1973
Railway lines opened in 1978
5 ft 6 in gauge railways in Sri Lanka
Railway lines in Sri Lanka
Transport in Western Province, Sri Lanka
2 ft 6 in gauge railways in Sri Lanka
1912 establishments in Ceylon